South Campus/Fort Edmonton Park station is an Edmonton Light Rail Transit station in Edmonton, Alberta. It is served by the Capital Line. It is a ground-level station located on the University of Alberta's South Campus approximately two blocks to the west of the site originally proposed for the station on 113 Street.

History
The station was formally opened on April 25, 2009, with regular service commencing on April 26, 2009.

South Campus was the southern terminus of the Capital Line for 52 weeks, from 2009 to 2010.

On September 18, 2018, a man was stabbed on the platform while waiting for the train.

Name
On September 5, 2012, Edmonton City Council's executive committee voted to change the name of the station from "South Campus" to "South Campus/Fort Edmonton Park", citing Fort Edmonton Park lobbying for their name to be added since the station's opening. This vote was against the advice of the city's naming committee, who had originally chosen not to add Fort Edmonton Park to the name, because of its distance from the station – 3.4 kilometres. This change led to some negative feedback from the public, believing that tourists to the city would expect the park to be within walking distance of that station, and not a five-minute bus ride.  As of 2021, the connection between the station and Fort Edmonton Park is made through ETS' On-Demand Transit.

Station layout
The station has a 123 metre long centre loading platform that can accommodate two five-car trains at the same time, one on each side of the platform. The platform is exactly nine metres wide.

Around the station
University of Alberta South Campus
Foote Field
Saville Sports Centre
Alberta School for the Deaf
Grandview Heights 
Lendrum Place
Neil Crawford Provincial Centre
Parkallen

South Campus/Fort Edmonton Park Transit Centre

The South Campus/Fort Edmonton Park Transit Centre is adjacent to the LRT station to the west. It has several amenities including public washrooms, a large shelter, a pay phone and vending machines. There is no drop-off area or park & ride. The transit centre itself is not directly at Fort Edmonton Park; it is  driving distance from the attraction. 

Since April 28, 2019 South Campus/Fort Edmonton Park Transit Centre and Lewis Farms Transit Centre have been reconfigured as part of a "Drop-Off Zone Pilot Project". As a part of this pilot, all buses dropping off passengers will do so at one of two "drop-off zones", before proceeding to the route's designated "boarding bay" to pick up passengers. At Lewis Farms in particular, any buses that are considerably early will wait at a designated "layover area" after dropping off passengers at the drop off zone but before picking up new passengers at the boarding bay.

The following bus routes serve the transit centre:

The above list does not include LRT services from the adjacent LRT station.

Notes

References

External links

Edmonton Light Rail Transit stations
Railway stations in Canada opened in 2009
Edmonton Transit Service transit centres
Railway stations in Canada at university and college campuses
Capital Line